Exile's Gate is a 1988 fantasy novel by American writer C. J. Cherryh. It is the fourth of four books comprising The Morgaine Stories, chronicling the deeds of Morgaine, a woman consumed by a mission of the utmost importance, and her chance-met companion, Nhi Vanye i Chya.

Plot summary
Morgaine must meet her greatest challenge: Gault, who is both human and alien, and also seeks control of the world and its Gate. She will meet the true Gatemaster, a mysterious lord with power as great as, or greater, than her own.

References
C. J. Cherryh. Exile's Gate. DAW Books 1988. .

Further reading

1988 American novels
1988 fantasy novels
Fantasy novels by C. J. Cherryh
Novels set in the future
Sequel novels
DAW Books books
Books with cover art by Michael Whelan